The men's 4 × 100 metres relay event at the 1971 Pan American Games was held in Cali on 4 and 5 August.

Medallists

Results

Heats

Final

References

Athletics at the 1971 Pan American Games
1971